Hickory Creek is a tributary of the Illinois River in Washington County, Arkansas, in the United States. Its GNIS I.D. number is 50050.

References

Rivers of Washington County, Arkansas
Rivers of Arkansas